The Story on Page One is a 1959 American drama film written and directed by Clifford Odets, and starring Rita Hayworth, Anthony Franciosa, and Gig Young. Shot in CinemaScope, the film was distributed by 20th Century Fox.

Plot
As the film begins, young Los Angeles lawyer Victor Santini (Franciosa) is hired to defend Josephine "Jo" Morris (Hayworth), who is accused of conspiring with Larry Ellis (Young) to murder her husband Mike Morris (Ryder), a police detective. In flashbacks, it is shown that her marriage to Morris is loveless and dull.  She met Ellis a widower, with whom she finds companionship and comfort. The two see each other regularly, and are intimate once. Larry's mother (Dunnock), a righteous, controlling mother, finds out about their relationship. She threatens to expose Jo to her husband unless it stops. Jo tells Larry what had happened, and Larry travels to see her and comfort her.

Believing her husband is asleep, Jo lets Larry into her kitchen to talk. However, Mike discovers them, and pulls out his service revolver and struggles with Larry. It ends with Mike being shot dead. Both are charged with first-degree murder (which at the time carried the death penalty), and a large part of the film consists of their trial.

At the trial, prosecuting attorney Phil Stanley (Meisner) stresses how Jo first told police that a prowler had killed her husband, until a cuff link belonging to Larry was discovered at the scene of the crime. He also notes that an insurance policy was purchased a week before the shooting.

Santini, a Harvard Law School graduate, skillfully erodes the prosecution's case, and includes a devastating cross-examination of Larry's mother. Both defendants are found not guilty and leave the courtroom together, after being individually counseled by the presiding judge in his chambers.

Cast

See also
 List of American films of 1960
 List of American films of 1959

References

External links
 
 
 

1959 films
1959 drama films
20th Century Fox films
American drama films
American black-and-white films
Films about adultery in the United States
Films scored by Elmer Bernstein
CinemaScope films
1960s English-language films
1950s English-language films
1950s American films
1960s American films